The 72nd Academy Awards ceremony, presented by the Academy of Motion Picture Arts and Sciences (AMPAS), honored films released in 1999 and took place on March 26, 2000, at the Shrine Auditorium in Los Angeles, beginning at 5:30 p.m. PST / 8:30 p.m. EST. During the ceremony, the AMPAS presented Academy Awards (commonly referred to as Oscars) in 23 categories. The ceremony, televised in the United States by ABC, was produced by husband-and-wife producing team Richard and Lili Fini Zanuck and was directed by Louis J. Horvitz. Actor Billy Crystal hosted the show for the seventh time. He first presided over the 62nd ceremony held in 1990 and had last hosted the 70th ceremony held in 1998. Three weeks earlier in a ceremony at the Regent Beverly Wilshire Hotel in Beverly Hills, California held on March 4, the Academy Awards for Technical Achievement were presented by host Salma Hayek.

American Beauty won five awards, including Best Picture. Other winners included The Matrix with four awards, The Cider House Rules and Topsy-Turvy with two, and All About My Mother, Boys Don't Cry, Girl, Interrupted, King Gimp, My Mother Dreams the Satan's Disciples in New York, The Old Man and the Sea, One Day in September, The Red Violin, Sleepy Hollow, and Tarzan with one. The telecast garnered almost 47 million viewers in the United States.

Winners and nominees

The nominees for the 72nd Academy Awards were announced on February 15, 2000, at 5:38 a.m. PST (13:38 UTC) at the Samuel Goldwyn Theater in Beverly Hills, California, by Robert Rehme, president of the academy, and the actor Dustin Hoffman. American Beauty received the most nominations with eight total; The Cider House Rules and The Insider tied for second with seven nominations each.

The winners were announced during the awards ceremony on March 26, 2000. Sam Mendes was the sixth person to win Best Director for his directorial debut. Best Actor winner Kevin Spacey became the tenth performer to win acting Oscars in both lead and supporting categories. By virtue of her father Jon Voight's Best Lead Actor win for 1978's Coming Home, Best Supporting Actress winner Angelina Jolie and Voight became the second father-daughter Oscar acting winners. At the age of 11, Haley Joel Osment became the second-youngest actor to receive a nomination in Best Supporting Actor for his role in The Sixth Sense, after Justin Henry was nominated in the same category for 1979's Kramer vs. Kramer at the age of 8.

Awards

Winners are listed first, highlighted in boldface, and indicated with a double dagger.

Academy Honorary Award
 Andrzej Wajda

Irving G. Thalberg Award
 Warren Beatty

Films with multiple nominations and awards

The following 17 films received multiple nominations:

The following four films received multiple awards:

Presenters and performers
The following individuals presented awards or performed musical numbers.

Presenters (in order of appearance)

Performers (in order of appearance)

Ceremony information

In view of the new millennium, the academy sought to both shorten the telecast and give the ceremony a new look. Husbandandwife producers Richard D. Zanuck and Lili Fini Zanuck were recruited to oversee the production of the 2000 ceremony. AMPAS President Robert Rehme explained the decision to hire the Zanucks saying, "With this new producing team in place, I look forward to a whole new perspective." This marked the first occurrence that a woman was tapped for producing duties at the Oscars. Despite Richard and Lili's promises to make changes to the ceremony, they hired actor and veteran Oscar host Billy Crystal to host the ceremony for the seventh time.

Production of the ceremony was reported to be far more ambitious and extravagant than previous ceremonies. Art director Bob Keene designed an ambitiously technological stage design for the telecast that used a floor adorned with flashing lights and several 35 foot columns consisting of high-definition video monitors stacked atop each other. The columns were used to display images of previous Oscar appearances as presenters took the stage, nomination packages, and reaction shots of the acting nominees as the winner was being announced. Because of serious technical challenges concerning movement, lighting, and overheating, Keene and his production design team tested the stage at ABC Prospect Studios before installing it at the Shrine Auditorium.

Several other people were involved in the production of the ceremony. Actor Peter Coyote, who served as announcer for the telecast, was often seen before commercial breaks live behind the stage. Musical directors Burt Bacharach, Don Was, and Rob Shrock composed a techno-pop soundtrack that substituted for a live orchestra during most of the ceremony. In addition, Bacharach rounded up musicians that included Garth Brooks, Queen Latifah, and Dionne Warwick to perform a medley of songs previously nominated for Best Original Song. Choreographer Kenny Ortega supervised the "Blame Canada" musical number.

Box office performance of nominees
At the time of the nominations announcement on February 15, the combined gross of the five Best Picture nominees was $521 million with an average of $104 million per film. The Sixth Sense was the highest earner among the Best Picture nominees with $278.4 million in domestic box office receipts. The film was followed by The Green Mile ($120.7 million), American Beauty ($74.7 million), The Cider House Rules ($20.7 million), and finally The Insider ($26.6 million).

Of the top 50 grossing movies of the year, 37 nominations went to 11 films on the list. Only The Sixth Sense (2nd), The Green Mile (13th), The Talented Mr. Ripley (26th), and American Beauty (27th) were nominated for directing, acting, screenwriting, or Best Picture. The other top 50 box office hits that earned the nominations were Star Wars Episode I: The Phantom Menace (1st), Toy Story 2 (3rd), The Matrix (5th), Tarzan (6th), The Mummy (8th), Stuart Little (11th), and Sleepy Hollow (20th).

Missing paper ballots
Nearly two weeks before Oscar voting was finished, AMPAS reported that 4,000 of the ballots mailed to Academy members were missing. The bags that carried the ballots were mislabeled as third-class mail. On March 6, 2000, 1,000 of the ballots were discovered at a US Postal Service regional distribution center in Bell, California. In response to affected members, AMPAS sent replacement ballots sealed in yellow envelopes, and extended the voting deadline by two days to March 23.

Oscar statuettes theft
On March 10, 2000, 55 Oscar statuettes were stolen from a Roadway Express loading dock in Bell, California. In the event the stolen awards were to be still missing during the festivities, AMPAS announced that R.S. Owens & Company, the manufacturer of the awards would produce a new batch of the golden statuettes. Nine days later, 52 of the stolen statuettes were discovered in a trash bin at a Food 4 Less supermarket located in the Koreatown neighborhood of Los Angeles by a man named Willie Fulgear. For the safe recovery of the stolen statuettes, Roadway Express rewarded Fulgear with $50,000, and the academy invited him and his son Allen to the ceremony. Two Roadway Express employees, truck driver Lawrence Ledent and dock worker Anthony Hart, were arrested for the theft of the Oscars. Both men pleaded no contest. Lawrence served six months in prison and Anthony received probation. A third man who was Mr. Fulgear's half-brother was initially charged with the crime, but police dropped those charges after Mr. Fulgear divulged that they were estranged from each other. Three years later, one of three remaining missing Oscar statuettes was discovered during a drug bust at a mansion in Miami, Florida; the other two have yet to be found.

Critical reviews
The show received a positive reception from most media publications. Television critic Monica Collins of the Boston Herald praised producers Richard and Lili Fini Zanuck for overseeing a show that was "clean, snappy, high-gloss and very well produced." She also quipped that host Billy Crystal did not need to save the show this time because "everything seemed to come together. The San Francisco Examiner Wesley Morris wrote "the show was downright hip, more so than it's been in decades." He also gave high marks for the "techno-chic" production elements from the music and stage design. Columnist Paul Brownfield of the Los Angeles Times raved that "the 72nd annual Academy Awards telecast was hipper than in years past, sleeker in look and edgier in tone." He added that Crystal was "the perfect antidote to the entire evening's self-serious posturing."

Some media outlets were more critical of the show. John Carman of the San Francisco Chronicle lamented that despite being solid and tidy, "the show never quite managed the big surprises, sloppy excesses and emotional highs we hope to see." Pittsburgh Post-Gazette television critic Rob Owen criticized the uneven pacing of the ceremony writing that the telecast "started slowly – 20 minutes of Billy Crystal's spoofs and singing that weren't as funny as his past Oscar intros – and never got up to speed." Caryn James of The New York Times remarked that "the four-hour show turned into a zombie." She also stated that the telecast was bloated with too many tributes to Hollywood's past.

Ratings and reception
The American telecast on ABC drew in an average of 46.52 million viewers over its length, which was a 3% increase from the previous year's ceremony. An estimated 79.11 million total viewers watched all or part of the awards. The show also drew higher Nielsen ratings compared to the previous ceremony with 29.64% of households watching over a 48.32 share. It also drew a higher 1849 demo rating with a 19.86 rating over a 39.34 share among viewers in that demographic.

In July 2000, the show received nine nominations at the 52nd Primetime Emmy Awards. Two months later, the ceremony won one of those nominations for Louis J. Horvitz's direction of the telecast.

In Memoriam
The annual In Memoriam tribute, presented by actor Edward Norton, honored the following people.

Sylvia Sidney - Actress
Jim Varney - Actor
Ernest Gold – Composer
Ruth Roman - Actress
Henry Jones - Actor
Robert Bresson – Director
Desmond Llewelyn - Actor
Allan Carr – Producer
Mario Puzo – Screenwriter
Rory Calhoun - Actor
Frank Tarloff – Screenwriter
Marc Davis – Animator
Hedy Lamarr - Actress
Victor Mature - Actor
Garson Kanin – Screenwriter
Roger Vadim – Producer/Director
Mabel King - Actress
Oliver Reed - Actor
Albert Whitlock – Special Effects
Ian Bannen - Actor
Abraham Polonsky – Screenwriter
Dirk Bogarde - Actor
Edward Dmytryk – Director
Lila Kedrova - Actress
Charles 'Buddy' Rogers - Actor/musician
Madeline Kahn - Actress
George C. Scott - Actor

See also

 6th Screen Actors Guild Awards
 20th Golden Raspberry Awards
 42nd Grammy Awards
 52nd Primetime Emmy Awards
 53rd British Academy Film Awards
 54th Tony Awards
 57th Golden Globe Awards
 List of submissions to the 72nd Academy Awards for Best Foreign Language Film

References

Bibliography

External links
Official websites
 Academy Awards Official website
 The Academy of Motion Picture Arts and Sciences Official website
 Oscar's Channel at YouTube (run by the Academy of Motion Picture Arts and Sciences)

News resources
 Oscars 2000 BBC News
 Academy Awards coverage CNN

Analysis
 1999 Academy Awards Winners and History Filmsite
 Academy Awards, USA: 2000 Internet Movie Database

1999 film awards
2000 in American cinema
Academy Awards ceremonies
2000 in Los Angeles
2000 awards in the United States
March 2000 events in the United States
Television shows directed by Louis J. Horvitz